Walter de Gray Birch (1842–1924) was an English historian, editor and author. He is best known for his Cartularium Saxonicum — A Collection of Charters Relating to Anglo-Saxon History, which supersede John Mitchell Kemble's Codex Diplomaticus Aevi Saxonici.

History
Birch worked in the British Museum Department of Manuscripts between 1864 and 1902, transcribing and cataloguing Anglo-Saxon charters.

Bibliography
His large output includes:

References 

Historians of England
19th-century English historians
1842 births
1924 deaths
20th-century English historians